Bostrychoplites cornutus is a beetle species in the genus Bostrychoplites. Pupae have been found in wood of deciduous trees. The species has been introduced to many countries in Africa south of the Sahara Desert, including Gambia.

References

External links

Bostrichidae
Beetles of Europe
Beetles described in 1790